Ida Baumann (1864–1932) was a painter from the Swiss canton of Appenzell Ausserrhoden. She specialised in painting portraits and, in 1890, she moved to England where her subjects included members of the nobility on their estates.

Gallery

References

Swiss painters